One Day in Your Life may refer to: 

 One Day in Your Life (album), an album by Michael Jackson
 "One Day in Your Life" (Michael Jackson song)
 "One Day in Your Life" (Anastacia song)
 "One Day in Your Life" (54-40 song)